Leo Bersani (April 16, 1931 – February 20, 2022) was an American academic, known for his contributions to French literary criticism and queer theory. He was known for his 1987 essay "Is the Rectum a Grave?" and his 1995 book Homos.

Bersani was born in the Bronx. He studied at Harvard University, graduating in 1952 with a bachelor’s in Romance languages, and with a Ph.D. in comparative literature in 1958. He taught at Wellesley College and Rutgers University before joining University of California, Berkeley in 1972, where he'd remain for the rest of his career, assuming emeritus status in 1996. He was elected a Fellow of the American Academy of Arts and Sciences in 1992. He married his partner, Sam Geraci, in 2014, and died at a care facility under the care of Hospice in Peoria, Arizona, on February 20, 2022, at 1:46AM at the age of 90 with his partner Sam Geraci at his side.

Bibliography
 Marcel Proust: The Fictions of Life and of Art (Oxford Univ. Press, 1965)
 Balzac to Beckett (Oxford Univ. Press, 1970)
 A Future for Astyanax (Little, Brown, 1976) 
 Baudelaire and Freud (Univ. California Press, 1977)
 The Death of Stéphane Mallarmé (Cambridge Univ. Press, 1982)
 The Forms of Violence (with Ulysses Dutoit, Schocken Books, N.Y., 1985)
 The Freudian Body: Psychoanalysis and Art (Columbia University Press, 1986)
 The Culture of Redemption (Harvard Univ. Press, 1990)
 Arts of Impoverishment: Beckett, Rothko and Resnais (with Ulysse Dutoit, Harvard Univ. Press, 1993); 
 Homos (Harvard Univ. Press, 1995)
  Caravaggio's Secrets (with Ulysse Dutoit, MIT Press, 1998)
  Caravaggio (with Ulysse Dutoit, British Film Institute, 1999)
  Forming Couples: Godard's Contempt (with Ulysse Dutoit, Legenda/European Humanities Research Centre, 2003)
  Forms of Being: Cinema, Aesthetics, Subjectivity (with Ulysse Dutoit, British Film Institute, 2004)
  Intimacies (with Adam Phillips, Univ. Chicago Press, 2008)
 Is the Rectum a Grave? and Other Essays (Univ. Chicago Press, 2010) — contains "Is the Rectum a Grave?" (originally published, 1987)
 Thoughts and Things (Univ. Chicago Press, 2015)
 Receptive Bodies (Univ. Chicago Press, 2018)

References

External links

Leo Bersani – French Department – University of California, Berkeley 
New York Times review of The Culture of Redemption
"A Conversation with Leo Bersani" conducted along with Tim Dean, Hal Foster, and Kaja Silverman, October vol. 82 (Autumn 1997)

1931 births
2022 deaths
20th-century American male writers
20th-century American non-fiction writers
21st-century American male writers
21st-century American non-fiction writers
American gay writers
American literary theorists
American writers of Italian descent
Fellows of the American Academy of Arts and Sciences
Gay academics
Harvard College alumni
Harvard Graduate School of Arts and Sciences alumni
LGBT people from New York (state)
Queer theorists
Rutgers University faculty
University of California, Berkeley College of Letters and Science faculty
Wellesley College faculty
Writers from the Bronx